Mdlaw Megbi is an Eritrean football club based in Asmara.

Performance in CAF competitions
CAF Champions League: 1
1998 – Preliminary Round

Football clubs in Eritrea